Robert Kauffman (July 13, 1946 – July 25, 2015) was an American professional basketball player  and coach. Kaufmann was a three time NBA All-Star.

Early life
Robert Alan Kauffman was born July 13, 1946 in Brooklyn, N.Y., to LeRoy and Anne Kauffman. He played at Scarsdale High School in Scarsdale, New York. The Kauffman family was in the saddle and bridle business. Kauffman’s Boots and Saddles was their business on East 24th Street in Manhattan.

College career
Kauffman played collegiately at NAIA Guilford College in Greensboro, North Carolina, from 1964–1968, playing under Coach Jerry Steele.

The 6-foot-8, 240-pound center is credited with turning the Quakers into an NAIA basketball powerhouse. During his four seasons, the Quakers won 86 games with three straight trips to the NAIA Tournament.

Kauffman scored 2,570 points on 64% shooting with 1,801 rebounds in his 113-game career. He averaged 22.7 points and 15.9 rebounds in his career. He holds Guilford school records for single-game rebounds (32), single-season rebounds (698, 1967–68), career field goals (943), single-season field goal percentage (.712, 1967–68), single-season free throws (273, 1966–67), career free throws (684), and single-season free-throw attempts (344, 1966–67).

Kauffman graduated with a history degree in 1968.

Professional career

Seattle SuperSonics (1968–1969)
Kauffman was selected with the third overall pick of the 1968 NBA draft by the Seattle SuperSonics behind future Hall of Fame inductees Elvin Hayes and Wes Unseld. Kauffman was also selected in the 1968 American Basketball Association Draft by the Oakland Oaks, but chose to play in the NBA.

As a rookie for Seattle in 1968–69, Kauffman averaged 7.8 points and 5.9 rebounds, playing behind Bob Rule.

Chicago Bulls (1969–1970)
On September 5, 1969, Kauffman was traded by the Seattle SuperSonics with a 1971 third round draft pick (Clifford Ray was later selected) to the Chicago Bulls for Bob Boozer and Barry Clemens. Kauffman played a reserve role for the Bulls in 1969–70, averaging 4.3 points and 3.3 rebounds in 12 minutes per game.

Buffalo Braves (1970–1974)
On May 11, 1970, Kauffman was traded by the Chicago Bulls with Jim Washington to the Philadelphia 76ers for Shaler Halimon and Chet Walker. Kauffman was sent as the player to be named later on May 11, 1970. Later, the expanded Buffalo Braves acquired him and a 1971 second round draft pick (Spencer Haywood was later selected) from the Philadelphia 76ers the day of the NBA Expansion Draft in exchange for veteran forward Bailey Howell. Kauffman never played for Philadelphia.

In 1970–1971, playing for the Buffalo Braves, Kauffman became an All-Star, averaging 20.4 points and 10.7 rebounds for the 22-60 Braves under Coach Dolph Schayes. He was a reserve for the first six games of the season, scoring 26 points total, before being inserted into the starting lineup.

The Braves struggled in 1971–1972, again finishing 22-60, but Kauffman was an All-Star for the second time, averaging 18.9 points and 10.2 rebounds. Kauffman had 44 points against Kareem Abdul-Jabbar and the Milwaukee Bucks on November 13, 1971.

Under new Coach Jack Ramsay, Kauffman was an All-Star again in 1972–1973, averaging 17.5 points and 11.1 rebounds for the 21-61 Braves.

In 1973–1974, the Braves improved to 42-40, making the playoffs. Kauffman became a reserve, averaging 6.1 points and 4.4 rebounds in 17 minutes, on a roster that included Hall of Famer Bob McAdoo, Randy Smith, and Gar Heard.

Atlanta Hawks (1974–1975)
On May 20, 1974, Kauffman was drafted by the New Orleans Jazz from the Buffalo Braves in the NBA expansion draft. He was immediately traded by the Jazz in a landmark trade. He was traded with Dean Meminger, a 1974 first round draft pick (Mike Sojourner was later selected), a 1975 first round draft pick (David Thompson was later selected), a 1975 second round draft pick (Bill Willoughby was later selected), a 1976 second round draft pick (Alex English was later selected), and a 1980 third round draft pick (Jonathan Moore was later selected) to the Atlanta Hawks for Pete Maravich.

With chronic groin and hip problems limiting his play, Kauffman played the final season of his career with the 1974–1975 Hawks. He averaged 3.9 points and 2.5 points in 73 games for the 31-51 Hawks, under Coach Cotton Fitzsimmons.

Career totals
Kauffman played seven seasons in the NBA as a member of the Sonics, Chicago Bulls, Buffalo Braves, and Atlanta Hawks.  A three-time All-Star (1971, 1972, and 1973), Kauffman averaged 11.5 points and 7.0 rebounds for his career. He had his statistically strongest season in 1970–71, when he averaged 20.4 points and 10.7 rebounds for the Braves.

NBA career statistics

Regular season 

|-
| style="text-align:left;"| 
| style="text-align:left;"|Seattle
| 82 || – || 20.2 || 442 || – || .702 || 5.9 || 1.0 || – || – || 7.8
|-
| style="text-align:left;"| 
| style="text-align:left;"|Chicago
| 64 || – || 12.1 || .425 || – || .715 || 3.3 || 1.2 || – || – || 4.3
|-
| style="text-align:left;"| 
| style="text-align:left;"|Buffalo
| 78 || – || 35.6 || .471 || – || .740 || 10.7 || 4.5 || – || – || 20.4
|-
| style="text-align:left;"| 
| style="text-align:left;"|Buffalo
| 77 || – || 41.6 || .497 || – || .795 || 10.2 || 3.9 || – || – || 18.9
|-
| style="text-align:left;"|
| style="text-align:left;"|Buffalo
| 77 || – || 39.6 || .505 || – || .780 || 11.1 || 5.1 || – || – || 17.5
|-
| style="text-align:left;"| 
| style="text-align:left;"|Buffalo
| 74 || – || 17.6 || .467 || – || .713 || 4.4 || 1.9 || .5 || .2 || 6.1
|-
| style="text-align:left;"| 
| style="text-align:left;"|Atlanta
| 73 || – || 10.9 || .433 || – || .702 || 2.5 || 1.1 || .3 || .1 || 3.9
|- class="sortbottom"
| style="text-align:center;" colspan="2"| Career
| 525 || – || 25.8 || .477 || – || .749 || 7.0 || 2.7 || .4 || .1 || 11.5
|- class="sortbottom"
| style="text-align:center;" colspan="2"| All-Star
| 3 || 0 || 6.7 || .400 || – || .500 || .7 || .7 || – || – || 1.7

Playoffs 

|-
|style="text-align:left;"|1970
|style="text-align:left;"|Chicago
|3||–||4.7||.333||–||.667||2.0||1.3||–||–||1.3
|-
|style="text-align:left;"|1974
|style="text-align:left;"|Buffalo
|2||–||5.0||.333||–||.000||.5||1.0||.0||.0||1.0
|- class="sortbottom"
| style="text-align:center;" colspan="2"| Career
| 5 || – || 4.8 || .333 || – || .400 || 1.4 || 1.2 || .0 || .0 || 1.2

NBA executive/coaching career
He had a short career as an NBA team executive with the Atlanta Hawks and Detroit Pistons. He spent two seasons as assistant general manager for the Hawks before Detroit hired him as the Pistons' general manager in 1977. He was with the Pistons from May 25, 1977 to July 14, 1978.

He served as coach of the Detroit Pistons in 1977–1978 after Herb Brown was fired, going 29-29 in 58 games. Kauffman eventually left the Pistons after a disagreement with team owner Bill Davidson. Kauffman wanted to hire Cotton Fitzsimmons or Al Bianchi for the coaching vacancy. Davidson wanted Dick Vitale from the University of Detroit. Vitale went 34-60 in his tenure as Pistons coach.

Death
Kauffman died at the age of 69. Although his career was not long he was able to accomplish many things. Kauffman came from a relatively small college and was one of the prominent and promising players in all of college basketball at his time. When he was drafted he played for several different teams and was successful for all of them. He was able to make the NBA All-Star Team in three of his seven seasons, from 1971–1973. While at Guilford he was an all-American and one of the best to ever play in the NAIA, coming as a top three pick in the 1968 NBA draft. Many believe Bob Kauffman should have played longer but due to injury had to call it quits sooner than expected. He was know as a physical player.

Some of Bob's more outstanding accolades from college include, 32 rebounds in a single game and 698 rebounds in a single season. He made 943 career field goals,  shot an impressive 71.2 percent in single-season from the field, 273 free-throws attempted in a single-season while shooting a total of 344 in a single-season, made nearly one third of his career free-throws (684), and had 344 single-season free-throw attempts (1966–67). 

Many believe the jersey worn by Kauffman when he played for the Buffalo Braves should be retired since he was the original star of the program.

As reported by NBA.com, Bob Kauffman's death went largely unnoticed in the sports world. He was the first real star for the Buffalo Braves, now the Los Angeles Clippers, making three consecutive appearances in the all-star game.
 
Kauffman was survived by his wife, Judy and four daughters; Lara, Joannah, Carey, and Kate.

Honors
 Kauffman was inducted into Guilford's Athletics Hall of Fame in 1973.
 Guilford College retired his jersey (#44) in 2009.

Head coaching record

|-
| style="text-align:left;"|Detroit
| style="text-align:left;"|
| 58 || 29 || 29 ||  || style="text-align:center;"|4th in Midwest || — || — || — || —
| style="text-align:center;"|Missed playoffs
|- class="sortbottom"
| style="text-align:left;"|Career
| || 58 || 29 || 29 ||  || || — || — || — || — ||

References

1946 births
2015 deaths
American men's basketball coaches
American men's basketball players
Atlanta Hawks players
Basketball coaches from New York (state)
Basketball players from New York City
Buffalo Braves players
Centers (basketball)
Chicago Bulls players
Detroit Pistons head coaches
Guilford Quakers men's basketball players
National Basketball Association All-Stars
New Orleans Jazz expansion draft picks
Oakland Oaks draft picks
Power forwards (basketball)
Scarsdale High School alumni
Seattle SuperSonics draft picks
Seattle SuperSonics players
Sportspeople from Brooklyn